Kotla Musa Khan is a city located 49 miles south of Bahawalpur District. It is 9 miles north of Ahmadpur East.  The population of the village is around 50,000. The major crops of Kotla Musa Khan are cotton, sugar cane and wheat.

PERSONAILITIES 

*Ejaz Ahmad Khan Baloch

* Umair Abdullah Dahir 
* Kamran Mehmood Dahir

* Taha Saeed Dahir.

Populated places in Bahawalpur District